Yorktown is a populated place in Forsyth County in the U.S. state of North Carolina.

References

Geography of Forsyth County, North Carolina
Towns in North Carolina